Walter Leandro Capeloza Artune (born 18 November 1987), simply known as Walter, is a Brazilian professional footballer who plays as a goalkeeper for Cuiabá.

Career statistics

Honours
Corinthians
 Campeonato Brasileiro Série A: 2015, 2017
 Recopa Sudamericana: 2013
 Campeonato Paulista: 2017, 2018, 2019

 Cuiabá
 Campeonato Mato-Grossense: 2021, 2022

References

External links
 Player profile 

1987 births
Living people
Footballers from São Paulo (state)
Brazilian footballers
Association football goalkeepers
Campeonato Brasileiro Série A players
Campeonato Brasileiro Série C players
Campeonato Brasileiro Série D players
Esporte Clube XV de Novembro (Jaú) players
Iraty Sport Club players
Rio Branco Sport Club players
Londrina Esporte Clube players
J. Malucelli Futebol players
Sociedade Esportiva e Recreativa Caxias do Sul players
Esporte Clube Novo Hamburgo players
União Agrícola Barbarense Futebol Clube players
Esporte Clube Noroeste players
Sport Club Corinthians Paulista players
Esporte Clube XV de Novembro (Piracicaba) players
Cuiabá Esporte Clube players
People from Jaú